Elizabeth is a 1998 British biographical period drama film directed by Shekhar Kapur and written by Michael Hirst. It stars Cate Blanchett in the title role of Elizabeth I of England, with Geoffrey Rush, Christopher Eccleston, Joseph Fiennes, John Gielgud, and Richard Attenborough in supporting roles. The film is based on the early years of Elizabeth's reign, where she is elevated to the throne after the death of her half-sister Mary I, who had imprisoned her. As she establishes herself on the throne, she faces plots and threats to take her down.

Elizabeth premiered at the 55th Venice International Film Festival on 8 September 1998 and was theatrically released in the United Kingdom on 23 October. The film became a critical and commercial success. Reviewers praised Kapur's direction, costume design, production values and most notably Blanchett's titular performance, bringing her to international recognition, while the film grossed $82 million against its $30 million budget.

The film received three nominations at the 56th Golden Globe Awards, including for the Best Motion Picture – Drama, with Blanchett winning Best Actress. It received twelve nominations at the 52nd British Academy Film Awards, winning five awards, including Outstanding British Film, and Best Actress (for Blanchett). At the 71st Academy Awards, it received seven nominations, including for Best Picture and Best Actress (for Blanchett), winning Best Makeup. In 2007, Blanchett and Rush reprised their roles in Kapur's follow-up film Elizabeth: The Golden Age, which covers the later part of Elizabeth's reign.

Plot
In 1558, Catholic Mary I of England dies from a cancerous tumour in her womb. Mary's heir and Protestant half-sister, Elizabeth, daughter of Anne Boleyn, under house arrest for conspiracy charges, is freed and crowned queen of England.

As briefed by her adviser William Cecil, Elizabeth inherits a distressed England besieged by debts, crumbling infrastructure, hostile neighbours, and treasonous nobles within her administration, chief among them the Duke of Norfolk. Cecil advises Elizabeth to marry, produce an heir, and secure her rule. Unimpressed with her suitors, Elizabeth delays her decision and continues her secret affair with Lord Robert Dudley. Cecil appoints Francis Walsingham, a Protestant exile returned from France, to act as Elizabeth's bodyguard and adviser.

Mary of Guise lands an additional 4,000 French troops in neighbouring Scotland. Unfamiliar with military strategy and browbeaten by Norfolk at the war council, Elizabeth orders a military response, which proves disastrous when the professional French soldiers defeat the inexperienced, ill-trained English forces. Walsingham tells Elizabeth that Catholic lords and priests intentionally deprived Elizabeth's army of proper soldiers and used their defeat to argue for Elizabeth's removal. Realising the depth of the conspiracy against her and her dwindling options, Elizabeth accepts Mary of Guise's conditions to consider marrying her nephew Henry of France.

To stabilise her rule and heal England's religious divisions, Elizabeth proposes the Act of Uniformity, which unites English Christians under the Church of England and severs their connection to the Vatican. In response to the Act's passage, the Vatican sends a priest to England to aid Norfolk and his cohorts in their growing plot to overthrow Elizabeth. Unaware of the plot, Elizabeth meets Henry of France but ignores his advances in favour of Lord Robert. William Cecil confronts Elizabeth over her indecisiveness about marrying and reveals that Lord Robert is married. Elizabeth rejects Henry's marriage proposal when she discovers he is a cross-dresser and confronts Lord Robert about his secret, fracturing their affair and banishing him from her private rooms.

Elizabeth survives an assassination attempt, evidence implicating Mary of Guise. Elizabeth sends Walsingham to meet with Mary secretly in Scotland, under the guise of once again planning to marry Henry. Instead, Walsingham assassinates Guise, inciting French enmity against Elizabeth. When William Cecil asks her to solidify relations with the Spanish, Elizabeth dismisses him from her service, choosing instead to follow her own counsel.

Walsingham warns of another plot to kill Elizabeth spearheaded by the Catholic priest carrying letters of conspiracy. Under Elizabeth's orders, Walsingham apprehends the priest, who divulges the names of the conspirators and a Vatican agreement to elevate Norfolk to the English crown if he weds Mary, Queen of Scots. Walsingham arrests Norfolk and executes him and every conspirator except Lord Robert. Elizabeth grants Lord Robert his life as a reminder to herself how close she came to danger.

Drawing inspiration from the divine, Elizabeth cuts her hair and models her appearance after the Virgin Mary. Proclaiming herself married to England, she ascends the throne as "the Virgin Queen".

Cast

Production
The costuming and shot composition of the coronation scene are based on Elizabeth's coronation portrait.

Kapur's original choice for the role was Emily Watson, but she turned it down. Cate Blanchett was chosen to play Elizabeth after Kapur saw a trailer of Oscar and Lucinda.
According to the director's commentary, Kapur mentioned that the role of the Pope (played by Sir John Gielgud) was originally offered to, and accepted by, Marlon Brando. However, plans changed when Kapur noted that many on set would probably be concerned that Brando would be sharing the set with them for two days.

A large proportion of the indoor filming, representing the royal palace, was conducted in various corners of Durham Cathedral – its unique lozenge-carved nave pillars are clearly identifiable.

Historical accuracy

Elizabeth received some criticism for factual liberties it takes and for its distortion of the historical timeline to present events which occurred in the middle to later part of Elizabeth's reign as occurring at the beginning. In his entry for Elizabeth I in the Oxford Dictionary of National Biography, Patrick Collinson described the film "as if the known facts of the reign, plus many hitherto unknown, were shaken up like pieces of a jigsaw and scattered on the table at random." Carole Levin, reviewing the film in 1999 for Perspectives on History, criticised the movie for portraying Elizabeth as "a very weak and flighty character who often showed terrible judgment", in contrast to historical descriptions of her as a strong, decisive, and intelligent ruler. In particular, Levin described the movie's portrayal of Elizabeth as dependent on Walsingham, in addition to the completely inaccurate portrayal of her relationship with Robert Dudley, as being instances in the film where the character appears weak and overpowered by the men around her.

There are inaccuracies in the timeline of events prior to her accession. The film depicts Mary I of England as being pregnant prior to Elizabeth's imprisonment. In actuality, Elizabeth was imprisoned on 18 March 1554 and released in May that year; it was not announced that the queen was believed to be pregnant until September of that same year.

Elizabeth was put under house arrest at Woodstock Palace, not Hatfield House, but did not remain there until her sister's death. On 17 April 1555, she was summoned to Hampton Court to be with Mary during the queen's delivery. When Mary did not give birth, Elizabeth remained at court until after it had become apparent that Mary was not pregnant and after her husband Philip II of Spain had gone abroad. It was only after this time that Elizabeth was finally able to return to Hatfield.

Robert Dudley, Earl of Leicester is wrongly depicted as having been a co-conspirator in the plot against Elizabeth. In fact, he remained one of Elizabeth's closest friends and supporters until his death in 1588, long after their romantic relationship had ended. The movie portrays Elizabeth as being ignorant of the fact that Dudley is married; it is her discovery of this fact that contributes to the breakdown of their relationship. In reality, Elizabeth was fully aware of Dudley's marriage to his first wife, Amy Robsart, who lived in isolation in the country, latterly suffering from breast cancer. Robsart died from a fall downstairs in 1560, two years into Elizabeth's reign, a fact never mentioned in the film. Dudley never converted to Catholicism, remaining a staunch Protestant all his life.

Mary of Guise was not assassinated by Walsingham, but died naturally from oedema on 11 June 1560. She was not the aunt of Francis, Duke of Anjou nor was she ever related to him, as the House of Valois and the House of Guise were two rival families.

William Cecil was portrayed by the 75-year-old Richard Attenborough in the film, but the real Cecil was half that age when Elizabeth was crowned, thirteen years older than she. Likewise she never compelled him to retire, as depicted in the film. He remained her chief adviser and was Lord High Treasurer from 1572 until his death in 1598.

The film portrays Kat Ashley, head lady-in-waiting to Queen Elizabeth, as being the same age as Elizabeth, but in reality, at the time of the then-25-year-old Elizabeth's coronation, Ashley was around 57, and she died six years later in 1565.

Bishop Stephen Gardiner died in 1555, before Elizabeth came to the throne and thus cannot possibly have been involved in the Ridolfi plot. The Earl of Arundel was not executed for his role (he was actually a child at the time), but was instead imprisoned in the Tower of London in the 1580s, dying there in the 1590s as a political prisoner, and the Earl of Sussex was actually a loyal supporter of Elizabeth who would not have tried to overthrow her.

Although the idea of marriage to Henry, Duke of Anjou (who was actually not Mary of Guise's nephew but son of Henry II) was briefly entertained, Elizabeth never actually met him, and moreover there is no evidence that he was a cross-dresser, as depicted in the film. Further, the film portrays the courtship as occurring at the beginning of Elizabeth's reign, when in fact it occurred in 1570, twelve years into her rule. The film also glosses over the considerable real-life age difference between the Elizabeth and Henry (in 1570 she was 37 years old and he 19). It was Henry's younger brother Francis, Duke of Anjou, 22 years younger than Elizabeth, who seriously pursued the English queen beginning in 1578, when she was 45 years old and he was 23. Furthermore, in the coronation scene, it is mentioned that Henry is already king indicating the age difference. Henry was 7 when Elizabeth was crowned and Francis was 3. The French Valois children at the time of Elizabeth's ascension are shown at least 10-15 years older. 

At the end of the film, Elizabeth is shown as having decided against marriage. In fact, she entertained the idea of marriage with several European monarchs well into middle age. Candidates included her former brother-in-law, Philip II of Spain; Archduke Charles of Austria; Eric XIV of Sweden; Adolphus, Duke of Holstein; and the Valois princes Francis and Henry (later King Henry III of France and Poland).

Soundtrack

Release
Elizabeth premiered in September 1998 at the Venice Film Festival; it was also shown at the Toronto International Film Festival. It premiered in London on 2 October 1998 and it premiered in the United States on 13 October 1998. It opened in the United Kingdom on 23 October 1998 and opened in limited release in the United States in nine cinemas on 6 November 1998, grossing $275,131. Its widest release in the United States and Canada was in 624 cinemas, and its largest weekend gross throughout its run in cinemas in the US and Canada was $3.8 million in 516 cinemas, ranking No.9 at the box office. Elizabeth went on to gross $30 million in the United States and Canada, and a total of $82 million worldwide.

Reception

Critical response 
The film was well received by critics. It holds an approval rating of 83% on the review aggregator website Rotten Tomatoes based on 65 reviews, with an average score of 7.40/10. The site's consensus reads: "No mere historical drama, Elizabeth is a rich, suspenseful journey into the heart of British Royal politics, and features a typically outstanding performance from Cate Blanchett." Metacritic reports a score of 75 out of 100 based on 30 critics, indicating "generally favorable reviews".

Accusations of anti-Catholicism
The Catholic League for Religious and Civil Rights accused the film of anti-Catholicism, stating that the film gives the "impression that the religious strife was all the doing of the Catholic Church", noting that the review in The New York Times considered it "resolutely anti-Catholic" complete with a "scheming pope" and repeating the charge made in the Buffalo News that "every single Catholic in the film is dark, cruel and devious."

Awards and nominations

See also
 BFI Top 100 British films

References

External links

 
 
 
 Shekhar Kapur in Interview with 99FACES.tv
https://www.moviemistakes.com/film407

1998 films
ARIA Award-winning albums
Anti-Catholicism
British biographical drama films
British epic films
British historical films
1990s biographical drama films
1990s historical films
BAFTA winners (films)
Films about Elizabeth I
1990s feminist films
Films critical of the Catholic Church
Films directed by Shekhar Kapur
Films featuring a Best Drama Actress Golden Globe-winning performance
Films set in the 1550s
Films set in Tudor England
Films that won the Academy Award for Best Makeup
Working Title Films films
PolyGram Filmed Entertainment films
StudioCanal films
Film4 Productions films
Films scored by David Hirschfelder
Best British Film BAFTA Award winners
Films produced by Eric Fellner
Films produced by Tim Bevan
Films produced by Alison Owen
Cultural depictions of Mary I of England
1998 drama films
1990s English-language films
1990s British films